National Highway 51 (NH 51)  is an Indian National Highway entirely within the state of Gujarat.

Route 
Bet Dwarka including Signatur Somnath Rajula, Mahuva, Talaja, Bhavnagar.

See also
 List of National Highways in India (by Highway Number)
 National Highways Development Project

References

External links
  NH network map of India

National highways in India
8E